Japonica may refer to:
 Latin for "of Japan"
 Japonica, a British common name for garden plants of genus Chaenomeles (flowering quince) including Chaenomeles japonica and others
 Camellia japonica, the common or Japanese camellia
 Japonica, subgenus of Fritillaria flowering bulbous perennial plants
 Japonica rice, a major variety of Asian rice
 Japonica (butterfly), a butterfly genus in the Theclinae subfamily
 'Japonica' group, species group of Caenorhabditis nematodes, including Caenorhabditis japonica and others
 Japonica, an SOE F Section network in the Second World War

See also